Khalid ibn al-Walid Stadium is a multi-use stadium located in the Syrian city of Homs. It is the 3rd-largest football stadium in Syria and is mostly used for football matches. It serves as a home ground of Al-Karamah SC and Al-Wathba SC and holds around 32,000 spectators.

History
The greater part of the necropolis of Tell Abu Sabun was made to disappear by 1952 in order to build the stadium.
Through the efforts of Homs city council, the ground was opened in 1960 as a simple football field to be known as Homs Municipal Stadium. The stadium was also named Jura Abou-Saboun Stadium. In 1967, a small tribune of 2,000 spectators was built to host a small number of supporters. In 1980, the capacity of the stadium was expanded to hold up to 12,000 fans, with the installation of new lighting towers. In 2004, the stadium was completely renovated and expanded to its current capacity of 32,000 spectators. In the same year, the venue was renamed after the sahabi Khalid ibn al-Walid who died and was buried in 642 in Emesa.

See also
List of football stadiums in Syria

References

Football venues in Syria
Buildings and structures in Homs
Homs